Flying Scooters, also known simply as Flyers, is an amusement ride consisting of a center post with ride vehicles suspended from arms attached to the center post. The ride dates back to the 1930s and 1940s when Bisch-Rocco manufactured the ride. In the early 2000s, Larson International revived the concept. In the early 2010s, Larson partnered with Majestic Manufacturing, Inc. to create a portable version of the ride.

When the ride is in operation, a motor causes the arms to spin, with centrifugal forces causing the ride vehicles to fly outwards. Each ride vehicle is equipped with a large rudder, allowing riders to control the motion of their vehicle. The minimum rider height requirement is usually 36 inches tall or more.

Cable snapping
Although Flying Scooters are generally considered a mild ride, a skilled rider can "snap" the cables suspending the vehicle, and thus gain a more extreme and out-of-control experience. Snapping is caused by the cables slacking due to quick motions of the vehicle. Snapping is made easier on older and faster Flying Scooters rides such as the Flyer at Knoebels or others manufactured by Bisch-Rocco. Some newer models, such as those manufactured by Larson, are designed to prevent snapping. Snapping is sometimes discouraged due to maintenance and safety reasons, and in the case of some parks, snapping is punishable by the ride cycle being stopped early and the offending rider being removed from the ride.

Installations

References

External links

Cable snapping performed on the Flyer at Knoebels 

Amusement rides